The Nokia railway station is located in the town of Nokia, Finland, on the track between Tampere and Pori. The station was completed in 1895, and trains between Tampere and Pori stop there twelve times a day, half of which in each direction. A train trip between Tampere and Nokia takes 14 minutes, according to the VR Group. There is a bus station in connection with the railway station, including a Matkahuolto cargo terminal, a taxi station, a café-kiosk and a business complex, containing a police station and a waffle café.

See also
Nokia, Finland

Railway station
Railway stations in Pirkanmaa
Railway stations opened in 1895